Church of Our Saviour (or Savior), Church of the Savio(u)r, Church of Our Merciful Savio(u)r, or variations thereof, may refer to many Christian churches dedicated to Our Saviour (Our Lord), including:

Americas

United States
(by state)
 Church of Our Saviour (Placerville, California)
 Church of Our Savior (Boynton Beach, Florida)
 Church of Our Saviour (Jacksonville), Florida
 Episcopal Church of the Saviour (Clermont, Iowa)
 Church of Our Merciful Saviour (Louisville, Kentucky)
 Saint Saviour's Episcopal Church and Rectory, Maine
 Church of Our Saviour, Brookline, Massachusetts
 Church of Our Savior, Worcester, Massachusetts
 Church of Our Saviour, Friend of Children, Michigan
 Cathedral of Our Merciful Saviour, Minnesota
 Church of Our Savior (Little Falls, Minnesota)
 Church of Our Saviour (Iuka, Mississippi)
 Church of Our Most Merciful Saviour (Santee, Nebraska)
 Church of Our Saviour (New Lebanon, New York)
 Our Saviour Church (Manhattan), New York
 Church of the Saviour (Syracuse, New York)
 Church of Our Saviour (Cincinnati), Ohio
 Church of Our Saviour (Mechanicsburg, Ohio)
 Church of Our Saviour (Killington, Vermont)
 Church of the Saviour (Washington, D.C.)

Asia

Azerbaijan
 Church of the Saviour, Baku, a former Lutheran Church in Baku, Azerbaijan, presently a concert hall

China
 Church of the Saviour, Beijing, Catholic church in China

Georgia
 Matskhvarishi church of the Savior, Matskhvarishi, Mestia 
 Speti church of the Savior, Speti, Sachkhere

Singapore
 Church of Our Saviour, Singapore

Europe 
 Church of the Savior in Bydgoszcz, Bydgoszcz, Poland
 Church of Our Saviour, Copenhagen, Denmark
 Church of Our Saviour, Esbjerg, Denmark
 Church of the Saviour, Birmingham, England
 Church of the Savior, Sacrow, Germany
 Church of the Saviour, Thessaloniki, Greece
 Church of San Salvatore, Campi, Norcia, Umbria, Italy
 Monastery of the Holy Saviour, Lecanto, Tuscany, Italy
 Church of Our Saviour, Malmö, Sweden
 Church of the Saviour Istanbul, Turkey
 Church of the Saviour at Berestove, Kiev, Ukraine

Malta
 Our Saviour's Church, Lija
 Our Saviour's Church, Qrendi
 Our Saviour's Chapel, Żejtun

Russia
Note: Thousands of churches are dedicated to the Transfiguration of Jesus in Orthodox countries, particularly Russia. Almost every historical Orthodox city has (or used to have) a church dedicated to this feast.
Cathedral of Christ the Saviour (Kaliningrad)
Cathedral of Christ the Saviour in Moscow
Church of the Savior on Blood in St. Petersburg
Church of the Saviour (Tyumen) in Tyumen

See also
 Saviour's Church (disambiguation)
 St Saviour's Church (disambiguation)